PDF Solutions is an American multinational software and engineering services company based in Santa Clara, California. The company is listed in the Nasdaq stock exchange and in 2020 generated revenues of US$88.5 million.

History 
PDF Solutions was founded in 1991 by John Kibarian and Kimon Michaels. In July 2001 the company went public.

Corporate affairs

Organizational structure 
PDF Solutions operates worldwide and is currently active in more than 10 countries. The company is headquartered in Santa Clara, California and has additional offices in the following regions:

 North America: Canada, USA
 EMEA: France, Germany, Italy, Netherlands, Palestine
 Asia: China, Japan, Korea, and Taiwan.

Management and leadership structure 
PDF Solutions is led by a leadership team of four. Co-founder and Director John K. Kibarian serves as president since 1991 and CEO since 2000. Additional members are Adnan Raza, CFO, Adrzej Strojwas CTO and co-founder Kimon Michaels, who serves as Director and Executive VP, Products and Solutions. The board of directors has eight members.

Financial results 
The following is an overview of the main financial results from recent years:

Products and services 
According to PDF Solutions the company currently serves more than 300 clients in 36 countries, including brands like Toshiba, Fujitsu, Sony and Qualcomm. Clients come from the fields of foundries, semiconductor design companies and equipment manufacturers.

The company produces software, hardware and semiconductor-based intellectual property (IP) to provide advanced data management and analytics that support the manufacturing and testing of integrated circuits and systems on chips used in electronic devices such as smartphones, computers and the advanced driver assistance systems (ADAS) of modern automobiles.

See also
 Electronic design automation
 Computer-aided manufacturing

References 

Companies listed on the Nasdaq
Electronic design automation companies
Electronics companies of the United States
Software companies based in California
2001 initial public offerings